Biphyllus is a genus of beetles in the family Biphyllidae, containing the following species:

 Biphyllus aequalis (Reitter, 1889)
 Biphyllus africanus (Grouvelle, 1914)
 Biphyllus allaudi Grouvelle, 1906
 Biphyllus amabilis (Grouvelle, 1916)
 Biphyllus andrewesi (Grouvelle, 1916)
 Biphyllus bolivari Grouvelle, 1905
 Biphyllus brevis (Grouvelle, 1914)
 Biphyllus canaliculatus Grouvelle, 1906
 Biphyllus cardoni (Grouvelle, 1916)
 Biphyllus centromaculatus (Grouvelle, 1916)
 Biphyllus clavatus Arrow, 1929
 Biphyllus complexus Sasaji, 1983
 Biphyllus concolor Grouvelle, 1906
 Biphyllus corpulentus Arrow, 1929
 Biphyllus decoratus (Grouvelle, 1916)
 Biphyllus distinctus (Grouvelle, 1916)
 Biphyllus dollmani Arrow, 1929
 Biphyllus egens (Grouvelle, 1916)
 Biphyllus elegans (Arrow, 1929)
 Biphyllus escalerae Grouvelle, 1906
 Biphyllus euphorbiae (Peyerimhoff, 1923)
 Biphyllus fastidiosus (Grouvelle, 1916)
 Biphyllus flavonotatus (Lea, 1921)
 Biphyllus flexuosus Reitter, 1889
 Biphyllus formosianus (Grouvelle, 1914)
 Biphyllus frater Aubé, 1850
 Biphyllus frequens (Grouvelle, 1916)
 Biphyllus fulvus (Grouvelle, 1909)
 Biphyllus histrio Grouvelle, 1906
 Biphyllus humeralis (Reitter, 1889)
 Biphyllus inaequalis (Reitter, 1889)
 Biphyllus infans (Grouvelle, 1914)
 Biphyllus inops (Grouvelle, 1916)
 Biphyllus insignis (Grouvelle, 1914)
 Biphyllus japonicus Sasaji, 1983
 Biphyllus jongensis (Scott)
 Biphyllus kasuganus Nakane, 1988
 Biphyllus kolosovi Nikitsky, 1983
 Biphyllus kuzurius Sasaji, 1984
 Biphyllus lanuginosus (Grouvelle, 1914)
 Biphyllus latipes (Grouvelle, 1916)
 Biphyllus lewisii (Reitter, 1889)
 Biphyllus loochooanus Sasaji, 1991
 Biphyllus lunatus (Fabricius, 1787)
 Biphyllus maculatus Grouvelle, 1906
 Biphyllus madagascariensis Grouvelle, 1898
 Biphyllus magnus Grouvelle, 1906
 Biphyllus maindroni (Grouvelle, 1903)
 Biphyllus marmoratus (Reitter, 1889)
 Biphyllus marshalli (Grouvelle, 1911)
 Biphyllus medius (Grouvelle, 1914)
 Biphyllus micros (Grouvelle, 1900)
 Biphyllus minimus Grouvelle, 1905
 Biphyllus minutus (Grouvelle, 1902)
 Biphyllus molestus (Grouvelle, 1913)
 Biphyllus obscuronotatus (Lea, 1922)
 Biphyllus odiosus (Grouvelle, 1913)
 Biphyllus ornatellus (Blackburn, 1903)
 Biphyllus oshimanus Nakane, 1988
 Biphyllus parvulus Grouvelle, 1906
 Biphyllus rosti (Grouvelle, 1916)
 Biphyllus rufopictus (Wollaston, 1873)
 Biphyllus sarisberiensis (Scott)
 Biphyllus satsumanus Nakane, 1988
 Biphyllus sauteri (Grouvelle, 1914)
 Biphyllus schenklingi (Grouvelle, 1914)
 Biphyllus semifuscus (Grouvelle, 1914)
 Biphyllus sicardi Grouvelle, 1906
 Biphyllus sjoestedti (Grouvelle, 1909)
 Biphyllus strigicollis (Scott)
 Biphyllus subellipticus (Wollaston, 1862)
 Biphyllus substriatus (Grouvelle, 1916)
 Biphyllus suffusus (Reitter)
 Biphyllus tenuis (Grouvelle, 1916)
 Biphyllus throscoides (Wollaston, 1873)
 Biphyllus tolae (Scott)
 Biphyllus turneri Arrow, 1929
 Biphyllus typhaeoides (Wollaston, 1862)
 Biphyllus undulatus Grouvelle, 1906
 Biphyllus uniformis (Grouvelle, 1914)
 Biphyllus ussuriensis Nikitsky, 1983
 Biphyllus variegatus (Scott)
 Biphyllus weisei (Grouvelle, 1914)

References

Biphyllidae
Cleroidea genera